Bruno Daniel Pereira Castro Moreira (born 6 September 1987) is a Portuguese former professional footballer who played as a forward.

Club career
Born in the village of Landim, Vila Nova de Famalicão, Moreira finished his development at S.C. Braga. He started as a senior with amateurs G.D. Joane, then went on to spend the following five seasons in the Segunda Liga, with Varzim S.C. and Moreirense FC.

In summer 2012, Moreira moved to the Primeira Liga with C.D. Nacional. His first game in the competition took place on 26 August, as he came as a 75th-minute substitute in a 3−1 away loss against former club Moreirense. His first goal arrived on 17 February of the following year, in a 1−1 draw at F.C. Paços de Ferreira. Whilst under contract with the Madeirans, he was loaned to PFC CSKA Sofia from Bulgaria, being released in January 2014 and signing for G.D. Chaves of the second division.

On 16 June 2014, Moreira moved to Paços Ferreira on a two-year deal. During his spell, he was always his team's top scorer, whilst competing in the top tier.

Moreira moved to Thai Premier League champions Buriram United F.C. on 17 May 2016. Returned to Portugal the following year, he went on to represent Paços and Rio Ave FC, signing for the latter on a free transfer on 19 May 2018 after the former's relegation.

Club statistics

References

External links

1987 births
Living people
People from Vila Nova de Famalicão
Sportspeople from Braga District
Portuguese footballers
Association football forwards
Primeira Liga players
Liga Portugal 2 players
Segunda Divisão players
S.C. Braga B players
G.D. Joane players
Varzim S.C. players
Moreirense F.C. players
C.D. Nacional players
G.D. Chaves players
F.C. Paços de Ferreira players
Rio Ave F.C. players
Portimonense S.C. players
C.D. Trofense players
First Professional Football League (Bulgaria) players
PFC CSKA Sofia players
Bruno Moreira
Bruno Moreira
Portugal youth international footballers
Portuguese expatriate footballers
Expatriate footballers in Bulgaria
Expatriate footballers in Thailand
Portuguese expatriate sportspeople in Bulgaria
Portuguese expatriate sportspeople in Thailand